The first season of the ABC American television drama series How to Get Away with Murder premiered on September 25, 2014, and concluded on February 26, 2015, with a total of 15 episodes. At the Television Critics Association Press Tour in July 2014, it was announced that How to Get Away with Murder would be a limited series, with only 15 or 16 episodes per season; the smaller episode count than most network series stems from a deal with series star Viola Davis. On May 7, 2015, the show was renewed by ABC for a second season.

For its first season, the series received numerous accolades. The show was honored as a Television Program of the Year by the American Film Institute. It was also named Outstanding Drama Series at the Image Awards and the GLAAD Awards. For her performance, Davis won the Emmy Award for Outstanding Lead Actress in a Drama Series, the Screen Actors Guild Award for Outstanding Performance in a Drama Series, and the Image Award for Outstanding Actress in a Drama Series. Davis received nominations from the Golden Globe Awards for Best Actress in a Television Series, the Critics' Choice Awards for Best Actress in a Drama Series, and the Television Critics Association for Individual Achievement in Drama.

Plot
Annalise Keating, law professor and criminal defense attorney at Middleton University, selects five students to intern at her firm—Wes Gibbins, Connor Walsh, Michaela Pratt, Asher Millstone, and Laurel Castillo—alongside her employees Frank Delfino and Bonnie Winterbottom, an associate lawyer. Season one explores two murders through flashbacks: Lila Stangard, mistress of Annalise's husband Sam Keating and a student at Middleton, and Sam Keating at the hands of Annalise's interns.

The first nine episodes alternate between flashforwards and the present day, to show the progression of events leading to the murder of Sam, who Annalise believes murdered Lila, and the disposal of his body by Wes, Connor, Michaela, and Laurel. The final six episodes explore Annalise's attempt to help her interns cover up Sam's murder and implicate Sam in Lila's death, as well as the events leading to Lila's death.

Cast and characters

Main
 Viola Davis as Annalise Keating
 Billy Brown as Nate Lahey
 Alfred Enoch as Wes Gibbins
 Jack Falahee as Connor Walsh
 Katie Findlay as Rebecca Sutter
 Aja Naomi King as Michaela Pratt
 Matt McGorry as Asher Millstone
 Karla Souza as Laurel Castillo
 Charlie Weber as Frank Delfino
 Liza Weil as Bonnie Winterbottom

Recurring
 Tom Verica as Sam Keating
 Megan West as Lila Stangard
 Conrad Ricamora as Oliver Hampton
 Alysia Reiner as Wendy Parks
 Lenny Platt as Griffin O'Reilly
 Lynn Whitfield as Mary Walker
 Arjun Gupta as Kan
 April Parker Jones as Claire Bryce
 Marcia Gay Harden as Hannah Keating
 Tamlyn Tomita as Carol Morrow

Guest
 Steven Weber as Max St. Vincent
 Ana Ortiz as Paula Murphy
 Elliot Knight as Aiden Walker
 Elizabeth Perkins as Marren Trudeau
 John Posey as William Millstone
 Cicely Tyson as Ophelia Harkness
 Michelle Hurd as Amanda Winthrop
 Tom Everett Scott as Andrew Crawford
 Sarah Burns as Emily Sinclair
 Jason Gedrick as Gabriel Shaw

Episodes

Production

Development
On August 19, 2013, ABC bought the original concept from Shondaland Productions, produced by Shonda Rhimes and Betsy Beers. The script for the pilot episode was written by Grey's Anatomy supervising producer Peter Nowalk. ABC ordered the pilot on December 19, 2013. It was directed by Michael Offer. On May 8, 2014, ABC picked up the pilot to series for the 2014–15 television season. At the Television Critics Association Press Tour in July 2014, it was announced that How to Get Away with Murder would be a limited series with only 15 or 16 episodes per season. The smaller episode count is the result of a deal for series star Viola Davis. On October 9, 2014, ABC picked up the series for a full season of 15 episodes.

Filming
The pilot episode was filmed in Los Angeles, California, at the University of Southern California, and in Philadelphia, Pennsylvania; in Bryn Mawr, Pennsylvania, at Bryn Mawr College; and in Collegeville, Pennsylvania, at Ursinus College.

Casting

The first season had ten roles receiving star billing. Viola Davis plays the protagonist of the series, Professor Annalise Keating, a high-profile defense attorney, teaching a class at Middleton University. Billy Brown plays Annalise's lover, Detective Nate Lahey, who tries to prove Sam's involvement in Lila Stangard's murder and becomes the main suspect in Sam's murder. There are five students who work at Annalise's law firm: Wes Gibbins, portrayed by Alfred Enoch, a student recently accepted off the wait list who later has a relationship with Rebecca; Connor Walsh, portrayed by Jack Falahee, a student who is ruthless and viewed as somewhat narcissistic by his peers; Michaela Pratt, portrayed by Aja Naomi King, an ambitious student who wants to become as successful as Annalise; Asher Millstone, portrayed by Matt McGorry, who comes from a privileged background and becomes affectionate towards Bonnie in the latter half of the season; and Laurel Castillo, portrayed by Karla Souza, an idealistic student who later has a relationship with Frank. Katie Findlay portrays Rebecca Sutter, Wes' mysterious neighbor (and later, girlfriend) who becomes a suspect in the murder of Lila Stangard. Charlie Weber plays Frank Delfino, an employee of Annalise's firm who is not a lawyer but handles special duties requiring discretion. Liza Weil plays Bonnie Winterbottom, an associate attorney in Annalise's firm.

Other recurring roles in the first season were Tom Verica who played Professor Sam Keating, Annalise's husband who had an affair with Lila Stangard and was later murdered by Wes. Megan West portrayed Lila Stangard, a sorority girl who was murdered by Frank on Sam's orders after he found out she was pregnant. Conrad Ricamora played Oliver Hampton, an IT specialist with whom Connor forms a romantic relationship. Alysia Reiner played Wendy Parks, a prosecutor who goes up against Annalise. Lenny Platt portrayed Griffin O'Reilly, a star quarterback and boyfriend of the murdered Lila Stangard. Elliot Knight played Michaela's fiancé, Aiden Walker, and Lynn Whitfield played his mother and Michaela's future mother-in-law, Mary Walker. Marcia Gay Harden played Dr. Hannah Keating, a psychologist and Sam's sister, who becomes suspicious of Annalise after Sam goes missing. Cicely Tyson portrayed Ophelia Harkness, Annalise's mother. 

On January 21, 2014, Matt McGorry was the first to be announced as a regular cast member, playing a law student. On February 25, 2014, it was announced that Shonda Rhimes had cast Viola Davis in the show's leading role of Professor Annalise Keating. Throughout February and March 2014, other roles were announced as cast: Aja Naomi King, Jack Falahee, Alfred Enoch and Karla Souza as law students; Katie Findlay as a drug-dealing student; Charlie Weber as a law associate to Professor Keating; Billy Brown as Professor Keating's extramarital love interest; veteran actor and producer Tom Verica as Professor Keating's husband; and Liza Weil as one of the professor's two associates.

On August 11, 2014, it was announced that Orange is the New Black alum Alysia Reiner was cast as a prosecutor who would be going up against Annalise. On November 4, 2014, it was announced that Oscar winner Marcia Gay Harden was cast in the second half of the first season for a secret recurring role. On December 15, 2014, it was announced that Oscar nominee and Emmy winner Cicely Tyson would appear in an episode in the second half of the season.

Reception

Critical response
The first season of How to Get Away with Murder received positive reviews, with most praising Viola Davis' performance. On Rotten Tomatoes, it has a rating of 85%, based on 57 reviews, with an average rating of 6.9/10. The site's critical consensus reads, "How to Get Away with Murder isn't conceptually original, but it delivers thrills with melodramatic twists and a captivating lead." Metacritic gave season one of the show a score of 68 out of 100, based on 30 critics, indicating "generally favorable reviews". 

Mary McNamara from Los Angeles Times wrote about Viola Davis' performance: "...all eyes are on Davis, Tony winner and Oscar nominee. Magnetic and intimidating, Davis creates an implacable surface beneath which shimmers all manner of fleet and startled emotions. Desire and fear, certainty, self-doubt and resolve are conjured in an instant with the angle of a glance, the lowering of an eyelid and then released as if they were never there." Entertainment Weeklys Melissa Maerz described Davis' performance as "powerfully layered." David Hinckle, from New York Daily News, said that the series does not serve up enough fun unlike Rhimes' other shows, Grey's Anatomy and Scandal. Frazier Moore, Associated Press, wrote that the show "promises to be twisty, wicked, dark and fun. And it stars Viola Davis, who brings life to a character of endless calculations and mystery."

Ratings
The series premiere had more than 14million viewers on live broadcast, and over 20million with DVR. The first episode set a record for DVR playback viewers with 6million, surpassing the January 27, 2014, record of 5.6million set by the pilot of The Blacklist.

Accolades

Critics' top ten lists
 No. 9 The Salt Lake Tribune
 No. 1 People Magazine
 No. 9 Us Weekly
 No. 10 Pittsburgh Post-Gazette 
  – The Globe and Mail
  – American Film Institute

DVD release
The DVD released was first released in Region 1 on August 4, 2015.

References

External links

 
 

2014 American television seasons
2015 American television seasons
Season 1